The Butterfly Effect is the fourth studio album by Portuguese gothic metal band Moonspell, released in 1999, inspired by chaos theory. The album is characterised by a more experimental approach than their previous material, incorporating many elements of electronic music and industrial metal. The music is composed primarily by the band's keyboardist, Pedro Paixão. "Tired" samples Mozart's Requiem.

Track listing

Credits

Band members 
 Fernando Ribeiro – vocals
 Ricardo Amorim – guitars
 Sérgio Crestana – bass
 Pedro Paixão – synthesizers, samples
 Miguel Gaspar – drums

Additional personnel 
 Oli Albergaria Savill – various misc instruments

Production 
 Paulo Moreira – photography, layout
 Patrick Bird – mastering
 Richard Hinton – engineering assistant
 Andy Reilly – producer, engineering, mastering
 Carsten Drescher – artwork, layout

Charts

References 

1999 albums
Moonspell albums
Century Media Records albums